The Virginia Beach Open was a regular golf tournament on the Nationwide Tour. It was played annually until 2006 at The TPC of Virginia Beach golf course in Virginia Beach, Virginia, United States.

The 2006 purse was $450,000, with $81,000 going to the winner.

Winners

Bolded golfers graduated to the PGA Tour via the final Nationwide Tour money list.

References

External links
PGATOUR.com tournament website

Former Korn Ferry Tour events
Golf in Virginia
Sports in Virginia Beach, Virginia
Recurring sporting events established in 2000
Recurring sporting events disestablished in 2006
2000 establishments in Virginia
2006 disestablishments in Virginia